PMIP may refer to:
 Paleoclimate Modelling Intercomparison Project
 Pan-Malaysian Islamic Party
 Pathology Messaging Implementation Project
 Proxy Mobile IPv6